The 1741 British general election returned members to serve in the House of Commons of the 9th Parliament of Great Britain to be summoned, after the merger of the Parliament of England and the Parliament of Scotland in 1707. The election saw support for the government party increase in the quasi-democratic constituencies which were decided by popular vote, but the Whigs lost control of a number of rotten and pocket boroughs, partly as a result of the influence of the Prince of Wales, and were consequently re-elected with the barest of majorities in the Commons, Walpole's supporters only narrowly outnumbering his opponents.

Partly as a result of the election, and also due to the crisis created by naval defeats in the war with Spain, Walpole was finally forced out of office on 11 February 1742, after his government was defeated in a motion of no confidence concerning a supposedly rigged by-election. His supporters were then able to reconcile partially with the Patriot Whigs to form a new government, and the Tories remained excluded from any realistic hope of forming a government.

Summary of the constituencies
See 1796 British general election for details. The constituencies used were the same throughout the existence of the Parliament of Great Britain.

Dates of election
The general election was held between 30 April 1741 and 11 June 1741.

At this period elections did not take place at the same time in every constituency. The returning officer in each county or parliamentary borough fixed the precise date (see hustings for details of the conduct of the elections).

Results

Seats summary

See also
List of parliaments of Great Britain
List of MPs elected in the 1741 British general election

References
 British Electoral Facts 1832–1999, compiled and edited by Colin Rallings and Michael Thrasher (Ashgate Publishing Ltd 2000). (For dates of elections before 1832, see the footnote to Table 5.02).

1741 in politics
General election
1741